Directive 92/100/EEC is a European Union directive in the field of copyright law, made under the internal market provisions of the Treaty of Rome. It creates a "rental and lending right" as a part of copyright protection, and sets out minimum standards of protection for the related rights of performers, phonogram and film producers and broadcasting organizations.

Rental and lending right 
The following rightsholders have the exclusive right, subject to limitations, to authorize or prohibit the rental or lending of their works [Art. 2(1)]:
authors in respect of the original and copies of their works (except buildings and applied art);
performers in respect of fixations of their performance;
phonogram producers in respect of his phonograms; and
producers of the first fixation of films in respect of the original and copies of their films.
This list is limitative: Portugal has been censured by the European Court of Justice for creating a lending and rental right in favor of videogame producers, as this annulled the exclusive nature of the rights of film producers.

The rental and lending right may be transferred, and is presumed to be transferred in film production contracts unless they contain provisions to the contrary [Art. 2(5)]: Member States may extend the presumption to authors and performers. However, even once the rental and lending right is transferred, the author or performer retains an inalienable and unaidable right to equitable compensation for the rental and lending of their works: this compensation is administered by the collecting societies.

Member States may allow a derogation for public lending (i.e. public libraries) provided that authors obtain some royalties [Art. 5(1)]. Member States may also exempt "certain categories of establishments" from the payment of royalties [Art. 5(2)]. These provisions is interpreted strictly: Portugal has been censured for a transposition which effectively exempted all public institutions from payment of royalties, and Belgium for failing to set a rate of remuneration (making its collection impossible).

Several countries already had Public Lending Right systems. However, the European Commission pointed out in a report in 2002 that many of these PLR systems failed to correctly implement the directive.

Related rights 
The Directive sets out the minimum rights which Member States must accord to performers, phonogram and film producers and broadcasting organizations (related rights), based closely on the provisions of the Rome Convention for the Protection of Performers, Producers of Phonograms and Broadcasting Organizations.
The preamble is clear (para. 20) that Member States may go beyond this minimum protection if they so wish. The 
fixation right (Art. 6) for performers with respect to their performances and broadcasting organizations with 
respect to their broadcasts is the exclusive right to authorize or prohibit recording. 
The reproduction right (Art. 7) is the exclusive right to authorize or prohibit reproduction:
for performers, of fixations of their performances,
for phonogram producers, of their phonograms,
for producers of the first fixations of films, in respect of the original and copies of their films, and
for broadcasting organizations, of fixations of their broadcasts.
The distribution right (Art. 9) is the exclusive right to make available to the public, for sale or otherwise, 
subject to the first-sale doctrine:
for performers, in respect of fixations of their performances,
for phonogram producers, in respect of their phonograms,
for producers of the first fixations of films, in respect of the original and copies of their films,
for broadcasting organizations, in respect of fixations of their broadcasts.
The fixation right, by its nature, is personal: the reproduction and distribution rights may be transferred, assigned or 
licensed.

Performers have the exclusive right to authorize or prohibit the broadcasting of their live performances, but not of recordings nor of rebroadcasts [Art. 8(1)]. Broadcasting organizations have the exclusive right to authorize or prohibit the rebroadcasting of their broadcasts "by wireless means", and the communication of their broadcasts to the public in places which charge an entrance fee [Art. 8(3)]. Phonogram producers have the right to an equitable remuneration (which may be fixed by agreement or regulation) if their published recordings are broadcast or played in public: this royalty is shared with the performers [Art. 8(2)].

The limitations on related rights are of the same nature as limitations on copyright. Four possible limitations are 
explicitly mentioned in Article 10:
private use;
use of short excerpts in connection with the reporting of current events;
ephemeral fixation by a broadcasting organization by means of its own facilities and for its own broadcasts;
use solely for the purposes of teaching or scientific research.
This article is an almost verbatim copy of Article 15 of the Rome Convention.

Duration 
The Directive originally fixed minimum periods of protection for the authors' rights and related rights which it created (Arts. 11, 12) in line with the Berne Convention for the Protection of Literary and Artistic Works and the Rome Convention "without prejudice to further harmonization". The further harmonization came with the Directive harmonizing the term of protection of copyright and certain related rights, which fixed the protection periods across the EU and repealed these two articles.

Implementation

See also 
Copyright law of the European Union
Bootleg recording
Broadcast piracy

References 

 Commission of the European Communities v Portuguese Republic (Case C-61/05), Judgment of the Court (Third Chamber) of 2006-07-13.
 Commission of the European Communities v Portuguese Republic (Case C-53/05), OJ no. C212 of 2006-09-02, p. 7.
 Commission of the European Communities v Kingdom of Belgium (Case C-433/02), OJ no. C289 of 2003-11-29, p. 10; ECR (2003) I-12191.
 Rome Convention for the Protection of Performers, Producers of Phonograms and Broadcasting Organizations
 Rebroadcasting by cable distribution is regulated by the Directive on the co-ordination of certain rules concerning copyright and rights related to copyright applicable to satellite broadcasting and cable retransmission (93/83/EEC), OJ no. L248 of 1993-10-06, p. 15.
 The question of limitations on copyright and related rights is treated in more detail (but without amending Art. 10) in the Directive on the harmonization of certain aspects of copyright and related rights in the information society (2001/29/EC), OJ no. L167 of 2001-06-22, p. 10, corrected by OJ no. L006 of 2002-01-10, p. 70.
 Council Directive 93/98/EEC of 29 October 1993 harmonizing the term of protection of copyright and certain related rights, OJ no. L290 of 1993-11-24, p. 9.
 Berne Convention for the Protection of Literary and Artistic Works (Paris Act), as amended on 1979-09-28.
 Luxembourg has also been censured by the European Court of Justice for its implementation of the public lending right: Commission of the European Communities v Grand Duchy of Luxembourg (Case C-180/05) OJ no. C143 of 2006-06-17, p. 20.

External links 
Text of the directive

Copyright law of the European Union
European Union directives
1992 in law
1992 in the European Economic Community